Community building may refer to:
 Community building, a social process
 Community centre, a building used by the community 

Community Building is also the name of the following individual buildings in the United States:
(by state then city)
 Chester Masonic Lodge and Community Building, Chester, Arkansas, listed on the NRHP in Arkansas
 Judsonia Community Building Historic District, Judsonia, Arkansas, listed on the NRHP in Arkansas
 Mineral Springs Community Building, West Fork, Arkansas, listed on the NRHP in Arkansas
 Old Vero Beach Community Building, Vero Beach, Florida, listed on the NRHP in Florida
 Manchester Community Building, Manchester, Georgia, listed on the NRHP in Georgia
 Linton Township High School and Community Building, Pimento, Indiana, listed on the NRHP in Indiana
 Community Building (Columbus Junction, Iowa), listed on the NRHP in Iowa
 Community Building (Princeton, Iowa), listed on the NRHP in Iowa
 Douglass Township Community Building, Douglass, Kansas, listed on the NRHP in Kansas
 Shady Grove School and Community Building, DeRidder, Louisiana, listed on the NRHP in Louisiana
 Churchill Theatre-Community Building, Church Hill, Maryland, listed on the NRHP in Maryland
 South Range Community Building, South Range, Michigan, listed on the NRHP in Michigan
 Dawson Armory and Community Building, Dawson, Minnesota, listed on the NRHP in Minnesota
 Stockton Community Building, Stockton, Missouri, listed on the NRHP in Missouri
 Ponca Tribal Self-Help Community Building Historic District, Niobrara, Nebraska, listed on the NRHP in Nebraska
 Community Building (Ticonderoga, New York), listed on the NRHP in New York
 Community Building (Salisbury, North Carolina), listed on the NRHP in North Carolina
 Caddo Community Building, Caddo, Oklahoma, listed on the NRHP in Oklahoma
 Gould Community Building, Gould, Oklahoma, listed on the NRHP in Oklahoma
 Mangum Community Building, Mangum, Oklahoma, listed on the NRHP in Oklahoma
 Poteau Community Building, Poteau, Oklahoma, listed on the NRHP in Oklahoma
 Dunlap Community Building, Dunlap, Tennessee, listed on the NRHP in Tennessee
 Community Building (Sparta, Tennessee), listed on the NRHP in Tennessee
 Lewiston Community Building, Lewiston, Utah, listed on the NRHP in Utah
 Richmond Community Building, Richmond, Utah, listed on the NRHP in Utah
 Women's Christian Temperance Union Community Building, Morgantown, WV, listed on the NRHP in West Virginia